The Kumozu River is a river in Mie Prefecture, Japan.

References

Rivers of Mie Prefecture
Rivers of Japan